The British Columbia Amateur Hockey Association, more commonly known as BC Hockey, is a non-profit organization and member branch of Hockey Canada in charge of governing amateur hockey at all levels in British Columbia and Yukon Territory. It comprises approximately 150 minor hockey associations, 55,000 players, 4,500 referees, and 20,000 official volunteers.

History
Founded in 1919 as the British Columbia Amateur Hockey Association, BC Hockey has seen many changes and substantial growth over the years. The organization continues to strive to provide training and resources for volunteers so that they may better serve the amateur hockey community.
 
The organization is overseen by a board of directors composed of 9 elected members.

Notable executives
Doug Grimston (1900–1955), BCAHA president from 1942 to 1947, and Canadian Amateur Hockey Association president from 1950 to 1952

Leagues

British Columbia Hockey League - Junior "A"
Kootenay International Junior Hockey League - Junior "B"
Pacific Junior Hockey League - Junior "B"
Vancouver Island Junior Hockey League - Junior "B"
Central Interior Hockey League - Senior "AA"
BC Elite Hockey League - U18 "AAA"
Pacific Coast Amateur Hockey Association - Minor

Independent teams
Fort St. John Flyers Senior "AAA" (North Peace Hockey League)
Powell River Regals Senior "AA"

Defunct Leagues
British Columbia Senior Hockey League
Cariboo Hockey League
Okanagan Mainline League
Pacific Coast Junior Hockey League
Pacific Northwest Hockey League
Rocky Mountain Junior Hockey League
West Kootenay League
Western International Hockey League

See also
List of ice hockey teams in British Columbia

References

External links
BCAHA Website

Amateur ice hockey
British Columbia
British Columbia
Ice hockey governing bodies in Canada
Ice hockey in British Columbia
Ice
Sports organizations established in 1919